Grant Reynard (October 20, 1887 - August 13, 1968) was an American painter, etcher, lithographer and illustrator.

Life
Reynard was born on October 20, 1887 in Grand Island, Nebraska. He studied at the Art Institute of Chicago.

Reynard became a painter, etcher and lithographer in New Jersey. He drew illustrations for Redbook, The Saturday Evening Post, Harper's Bazaar, Collier's and Cosmopolitan. He was the president of the Montclair Art Museum, and a member of the National Academy of Design and the American Watercolor Society.

Reynard married Gwendolyn Crawford, and they had two daughters. He died on August 13, 1968 in Leonia, New Jersey. His work can be seen at the Museum of Nebraska Art, the Fine Arts Museums of San Francisco, the Metropolitan Museum of Art, the National Gallery of Art, and the Smithsonian American Art Museum.

References

1887 births
1968 deaths
People from Grand Island, Nebraska
People from Leonia, New Jersey
School of the Art Institute of Chicago alumni
Painters from Nebraska
Painters from New Jersey
American male painters
20th-century American painters
American etchers
American lithographers
American magazine illustrators
20th-century American male artists